Sir James Houssemayne Du Boulay  (15 April 1868 in Hampshire – 26 November 1943) was a British civil servant.

Life and career
Houssemayne Du Boulay was the son of James Thomas Houssemayne Du Boulay and Alice Mead Du Boulay (née Cornish) and the great grandson of Francois Jacques Houssemayne Du Boulay.  His mother's grandfather was Sir Robert Wilmot, 3rd Baronet (1765–1842) of Chaddesden.  He was educated at Winchester College and Balliol College Oxford. On 31 July 1901 he married Freda Elais Butts Howell (1874–1957) granddaughter of Sir Thomas Howell.  Lady Houssemayne Du Boulay was Lady in Waiting to Queen Mary (1911, Delhi Durbar, India). They had four children.

After university, Houssemayne Du Boulay was selected for the Indian Civil Service. Thereafter his positions included:
 Bombay Presidency. 
 Lt -Col Indian Defence Force.
 Private Secretary to Governor of Bombay, Lord Northcote.
 Private Secretary to Governor of Bombay, Lord Lamington.
 Secretary to the Government of Bombay Political Department.
 Private secretary to Viceroy of India, Lord Hardinge of Penshurst.
 Secretary to Government of India Home Department.
 Temporary member of Governor General's Executive Council.
 Member of Indian Jails Committee.

Houssemayne Du Boulay retired in 1922.

See also
 Impact of the Hindu-German Conspiracy

References
 Burke's Peerage Ltd Burke's Landed Gentry; 18th ed. Vol. 1–3.  
 Lord Hardinge of Penshurst, My Indian Years 1910 - 1916. London: John Murray, 1948
 National Archives of his papers

1868 births
1943 deaths
People educated at Winchester College
Knights Commander of the Order of the Indian Empire
Indian Defence Force officers
Companions of the Order of the Star of India
Alumni of Balliol College, Oxford
James